Jiří Hledík (19 April 1929 – 25 April 2015) was a Czech football defender. He played for Czechoslovakia, for which he played 28 matches and scored one goal.

He was a participant in the 1954 FIFA World Cup where he played in the match against Uruguay.

In his country he played for Sparta Prague and FC Hradec Králové.

References

1929 births
2015 deaths
Czech footballers
Czechoslovak footballers
AC Sparta Prague players
Dukla Prague footballers
FC Hradec Králové players
Association football defenders
1954 FIFA World Cup players
Czechoslovakia international footballers
Sportspeople from Pardubice
Křídla vlasti Olomouc players